The 1942 Colorado A&M Aggies football team represented Colorado State College of Agriculture and Mechanic Arts in the Mountain States Conference (MSC) during the 1942 college football season.  In their first season under head coach Julius Wagner, the Aggies compiled a 4–3 record (2–3 against MSC opponents), finished fifth in the MSC, and were outscored by a total of 99 to 97.

Schedule

References

Colorado AandM
Colorado State Rams football seasons
Colorado AandM Aggies football